Eugene A. Fitzgerald is an American materials scientist and engineer currently the Merton C. Flemings-SMA Professor of Materials Science and Engineering at Massachusetts Institute of Technology.

References

Year of birth missing (living people)
Living people
MIT School of Humanities, Arts, and Social Sciences faculty
American materials scientists
Cornell University alumni